Lucky "Sheriff" Baloyi (born 19 June 1991) is a South African soccer player who plays as a defensive midfielder for Maritzburg United in the Premier Soccer League.

Club career
Baloyi got the nickname 'Sheriff' because nobody could get past him in at the back. He went for a trial at Chiefs from Tshiamo Sports Academy from Polokwane in 2005. There was a mix-up where Chiefs were expecting a defender, midfielder and striker and Tshiamo sent two midfielders and a striker.
"When we arrived at Chiefs they asked, 'So who of you guys is a defender?' and the three of us kept quiet … We were so scared, because we thought we were going to be dismissed and I was so desperate to play for Chiefs, so I raised my hand and said, 'I'm the one who is a defender!"
Baloyi did well at the trials and played in defence under Patrick Ntsoelengoe until Fani Madida took over to coach the reserves, when he was converted to midfield.

References

External links

1991 births
Living people
People from Mogalakwena Local Municipality
Tsonga people
South African soccer players
Association football midfielders
Association football defenders
Kaizer Chiefs F.C. players
Moroka Swallows F.C. players
Bloemfontein Celtic F.C. players
Maritzburg United F.C. players
Soccer players from Limpopo